The Rubicon Hydroelectric Scheme is a small run-of-the-river hydroelectric scheme located on the Rubicon and Royston Rivers, north east of Melbourne,  south-west of Alexandra, Victoria, Australia. The scheme commenced in 1922, and was the first state-owned hydroelectric scheme to generate electricity in mainland Australia, and among the first in the world to be remotely controlled. For the first ten years of its operation it supplied on average 16.9% of electricity generated by the State Electricity Commission of Victoria. It is now owned and operated by AGL Energy and contributes approximately 0.02% of Victoria's energy supply.

History
In the 1920s, the State Electricity Commission of Victoria investigated hydroelectric power generation, in parallel with work on brown coal-fired power stations at Yallourn. In 1922, a report was delivered by Messrs J.M. and H.E. Coane relating to the development of potential hydro-electric power on the Goulburn River and the Cerberean Range. Their findings were submitted to the Parliament of Victoria for funding, with the more cost effective project approved in 1922.

It was to be the largest power scheme on the State Rivers and Water Supply Commission of Victoria's ongoing construction of the Sugarloaf storage reservoir for irrigation. Greatly enlarged in the 1950s, the reservoir is now called Lake Eildon. The four other power stations comprised two on the Rubicon, one on the Royston, and one on Snobs Creek. The Sugarloaf Power Station generated electricity during the irrigation season from October to April, when water released from the dam could also be used for power generation. The other four power stations were used during the wetter seasons of winter and spring.

Work started in 1922 and, by 1928, the mountain stream section of the project was complete, with the Sugarloaf power station on the Eildon Weir following in 1929. Rubicon 'A' power station has a pipeline with a  drop over its  length. That station remotely controlled the other ones in the project. Minor enlargements were carried out at one station in 1954–55.

In the 1950s, the  Sugarloaf Power Station on the Goulburn River was replaced by the larger Eildon Power Station, after the weir was replaced by a much higher dam wall at the same site. The turbines were upgraded and reused.

Details of the Rubicon Hydroelectric Scheme
Today, the scheme consists of three small run-of-river dams, four power stations, and associated raceways and penstocks. The total generating capacity of the scheme is approximately 13 megawatts, which is achieved during the winter months.

Royston Power Station

The Royston Dam is a  concrete slab and buttress on the Royston River. It diverts water into an aqueduct that carries water for  into the neighbouring Rubicon Valley to the Royston Power Station forebay. The lower part of the woodstave section is now encased in concrete. Water from the power station outlet discharges into the Rubicon aqueduct about halfway along its length.

Rubicon Power Station

The Rubicon Dam is a  concrete-arch dam on the Rubicon River. It then travels a further  to the Rubicon Power Station forebay. The Rubicon penstock has a  drop over its  length. The Rubicon Power Station has two  horizontal single-jet Pelton wheel generators.

Lower Rubicon Power Station

This comprises a single  horizontal generator. The discharge water from the power station is returned to the Rubicon River.

Rubicon Falls Power Station

The Rubicon Falls Dam is on the Rubicon River below the Rubicon Dam. It diverts water around the Rubicon Falls into the Rubicon Falls Power Station through a  penstock.  The power station has a single  horizontal twin-jet Pelton wheel.

Tramway
A -gauge steel tramway was built for construction access between Rubicon Power Station and Rubicon Dam, with timber trestle bridges at Fifteen Thousand Foot Siphon, Royston Power Station, Beech Creek and Lubra Creek. The tramway remained in operation until the 1990s. An additional tramway was built for construction of the Royston power station and dam, and removed on completion.

The trestle bridges were replaced after their destruction in the 1939 Black Friday bushfires, and were again replaced as part of a maintenance program in 1960s. The Royston and Lubra Creek bridges were replaced in 1987 and 1991 respectively. The Beech Creek bridge was destroyed in February 2009 by the Murrindindi Mill fire, one of the Black Saturday bushfires. The Victorian Government agreed to rebuild the bridge in October 2011.

Heritage values
The Scheme is on the Victorian Heritage Register and the Register of the National Estate, and the surrounding state forest is set aside for its protection. The historical significance of the scheme is increased by its century of continuous use in essentially original form.

See also

 List of power stations in Victoria

References

External links

AGL: Rubicon Hydroelectric Scheme
Rubicon Hydroelectric Scheme, Rubicon, VIC, Australia, Australian Heritage Database, Department of the Environment
Notes for hikes in the Rubicon Valley Historic Area

Victorian Heritage Register
Environment of Victoria (Australia)